Massadona is an unincorporated community in Moffat County, in the U.S. state of Colorado.

History
Massadona was founded sometime prior to 1907, and was known as Boxelder. Although the origin of the name Massadona is unknown, it is possible that the original name of Boxelder came from a local creek, which is called Box Elder Creek. The name was changed between 1910 and 1954, possibly to avoid confusion with Box Elder in Adams County.

The post office in Dinosaur serves Massadona addresses.

References

Unincorporated communities in Moffat County, Colorado